Noe Rinonos (born 16 January 1942) is a Filipino weightlifter. He competed in the men's featherweight event at the 1968 Summer Olympics.

References

1942 births
Living people
Filipino male weightlifters
Olympic weightlifters of the Philippines
Weightlifters at the 1968 Summer Olympics
20th-century Filipino people